Uladzimir Mikalahevič Dubouka (15 July 1900 in Vilna Governorate (later Pastavy Raion, Vitebsk Region)20 March 1976 in Moscow) was a Belarusian poet, prose writer, linguist, and a literary critic.

Early life 
Dubouka was born on 15 July 1900 into a working family in a Vilna Governorate, his grandfather was a farmer and his father was a fabric worker. He went to school in 1905-1912, in 1912 he entered the specialized school, in 1914 he enrolled to New Vilejka Teachers' Seminary, that was later moved to Nevel. In 1918 he graduated and joined his family in Moscow, where they had moved in 1915. he tried to receive higher education and enrolled to the MSU History and Philology Faculty, but after two months he had to abandon studies and go to work to financially support his family.

In 1920 he served in telegraph line-laying company in the Red Army, after release in 1921 he worked at the People's Commissariat for Education as a school instructor and a guidance counselor. His first poem was published in 1921 and during the 1920s Dubouka became one of the leading Belarusian poets. 

In 1921 Dubouka entered Valery Bryusov's . The years in the institute played a significant role in the development of his talent, aesthetic perception, and literature skills.

In 1922-1925 he was chief editor of Belarusian publication 'Government Bulletin' and in the same time served as Executive secretary of the BSSR in the Soviet Union government. In that time he got to know Vladimir Mayakovsky and Sergei Yesenin.

In 1924 he visited Minsk for the first time, then went to Kharkiv and met there Ukrainian poets. During that period of life he also worked as an editor of literature page at the  newspaper. In 1926-1930 he edited 'The Code of Laws and Orders of the Workers-Peasant Government of the Union of Soviet Socialist Republics'. Though living in Moscow, he actively collaborated to development of Belarusian literature. Dubouka joined several literary unions and published some his poems in the western magazine 'Belorusskaya Kultura'.

In 1927 he married Maria Petrovna Klaus, soon they got a son named Olgerd.

Persecution 

On July 20, 1930, Dubouka was arrested in Moscow Kremlin by the Joint State Political Directorate and became a suspect during the investigation of the 'Case of the Union of Liberation of Belarus'. In April 1931 he was sentenced to deportation to Yaransk, soon his wife and son joined him. They were forcibly moved to country Sheshurga, then to Cheboksary. In July 1935 his five-year sentence was prolonged for two years.

In November 1937 Dubouka was arrested for the second time and sentenced to 10 years in prison in Chuvashia and the Far East. In 1941 his son Olgerd died while the family was in Taldom. After release in 1947 Dubouka and his wife moved to Zugdidi where they hoped to live in peace. The poet found a job of an accountant in the local state farm.

He was re-arrested on February 16, 1949, and sentenced to 25 years in prison. He was kept in Tbilisi prison, then moved to Krasnoyarsk Krai and worked as a carpenter.

Poetry 

Critics divide Dubouka's poetical heritage into two periods: between 1921—1930 and 1958—1976, where the first was more fruitful. Dubouka experienced influence of such classic Belarusian writers as Yanka Kupala, Yakub Kolas, and Maksim Bahdanovič. His way as a poet officially started in 1921 when his poem 'Belarusian Sun' was published in the 'Sovetskaya Belorussiya' newspaper. In 1923 he published a book of poetry 'Stroma', then in 1925 'Where the Cypresses Stand' and 'Cane', 'Credo' in 1926 and 'Nalya' in 1927. 

The poem 'For all the lands, all the people' which made him arrested in 1930 was published in the 'Belorusskaya Kultura' under a pen-name Yanka Krivchanin. Dubouka then never used this pseudonym again.

After 1958 he started working as a writer and interpreter, he translated Shakespeare and Byron into Belarusian, wrote tales and stories for children. In 1973 he published a book of memories «Пялёсткі».

According to the linguists, Dubouka significantly contributed to development of the Belarusian language. In his poems he frequently used neologisms and folk's local phraseology. He is an author of several linguistic articles regarding orthography and graphics of the Belarusian language, he also believed that the Cyrillic alphabet fit better to it than the Czech and Polish alphabets. He suggested introducing «ö» instead of «ё» and using «ї» like in the Ukrainian.

Maksim Harecki and Volodymyr Sosiura named Dubouka the greatest poet of the post-revolution Belarus.

Exoneration and recognition 
Dubouka was exonerated during the Khrushchev Thaw in November 1957. 

In 1958 he became a member of the Belarusian Union of Writers in 1958 and in 1962 a literary prize winner for the book of poetry "Polesian Rhapsody".

Further reading 
 История белорусской советской литературы. И.Я. Науменко, П.К. Дюбайло, Н.С. Перкин [History of Belarusian Soviet Literature, by I.Y.Naumenko, P.K. Dubajlo, N.S.Perkin], Академия наук БССР, Минск, 1977, p. 473-489

References

1900 births
1976 deaths
People from Pastavy District
People from Vileysky Uyezd
Belarusian writers
Belarusian male poets
Belarusian-language writers
20th-century Belarusian poets
20th-century male writers
Soviet military personnel of the Polish–Soviet War
Case of the Union of Liberation of Belarus
Prisoners and detainees of the Soviet Union
Soviet rehabilitations